Shanghai Disneyland may refer to:
 Shanghai Disney Resort, the resort located in Pudong, Shanghai which includes Shanghai Disneyland, 2 hotels and an entertainment district
 Shanghai Disneyland Park, a theme park in Pudong, Shanghai

See also
 Walt Disney Parks and Resorts